Lamponova is a monotypic genus of South Pacific white tailed spiders containing the single species, Lamponova wau. It was first described by Norman I. Platnick in 2000, and has only been found in Papua New Guinea and in Australia.

See also
 List of Lamponidae species

References

Lamponidae
Monotypic Araneomorphae genera
Spiders of Australia
Spiders of Oceania